Petrophile globifera is a species of flowering plant in the family Proteaceae and is endemic to southwestern Western Australia. It is a shrub with more or less cylindrical leaves and elliptic to spherical heads of cream-coloured to pale yellow flowers on the ends of branchlets.

Description
The flowers are arranged on the ends of branchlets in sessile, elliptic to spherical heads  in diameter, with narrow egg-shaped, sticky involucral bracts at the base.

Taxonomy
Petrophile globifera was first formally described in 2011 by Barbara Lynette Rye and Kelly Anne Shepherd in the journal Nuytsia from material collected by Donald Bruce Foreman in 1984. The specific epithet (globifera) means "sphere-bearing", referring to the flower heads.

Distribution and habitat
This petrophile mainly grows in sand in the area between Morawa, and Pithara.

Conservation status
Petrophile globifera is classified as "Priority Three" by the Government of Western Australia Department of Parks and Wildlife meaning that it is poorly known and known from only a few locations but is not under imminent threat.

References

globifera
Eudicots of Western Australia
Endemic flora of Western Australia
Plants described in 2011
Taxa named by Barbara Lynette Rye